Bear Creek is a stream in the U.S. state of Georgia. It is a tributary to Kinchafoonee Creek. A variant name is "Lochochee Creek".

The name Bear Creek is an accurate preservation of the native Creek-language name Nokosi Hachi, meaning "bear creek".

References

Rivers of Georgia (U.S. state)
Rivers of Stewart County, Georgia
Rivers of Terrell County, Georgia
Rivers of Webster County, Georgia